Audubon Wildlife Theatre is a Canadian documentary television series which aired on CBC Television between April 13, 1968 and June 1974. The series presented wildlife footage filmed by many contributors including award winner Dan Gibson and others such as Jack Carey, Wilf Gray, Edgar Jones, William Jahoda, John D. Bulger and Walter Berlet.

Episodes

References

External links
 Audubon Wildlife Theatre at the Canadian Communications Foundation

1968 Canadian television series debuts
1974 Canadian television series endings
CBC Television original programming
1960s Canadian documentary television series
1970s Canadian documentary television series